Velké Poříčí is a market town in Náchod District in the Hradec Králové Region of the Czech Republic. It has about 2,300 inhabitants.

History
The first written mention of Velké Poříčí is from 1496. In 1908, it was promoted to a market town.

References

Market towns in the Czech Republic